They Remain is a 2018 American thriller film written and directed by Philip Gelatt and starring Rebecca Henderson and William Jackson Harper.  It is based on Laird Barron's short story -30-.

Cast
Rebecca Henderson as Jessica
William Jackson Harper as Keith
Malcolm Mills as Pilot
Jordan Douglas Smith as Rudi "Tex" Roos (voice)
Charlies Lavoie as Cult Father

Production 
Writer/director Philip Gelatt first encountered Laird Barron's writing in "2008 or 2009". After reading the story "-30-" in Barron's collection Occultation and Other Stories, he became interested in adapting it. In terms of casting, Gelatt described the process as follows: "I wanted to find actors who had, in their own personalities, something that felt true to these characters."

Reception
The website's critical consensus reads, "They Remain relies on rich atmosphere to effectively establish a sense of creeping dread that's almost enough to cover for its nagging narrative deficiencies." Metacritic, which uses a weighted average, assigned a score of 49 out of 100 based on nine critics, indicating "mixed or average reviews".

Eric Kohn of IndieWire graded the film a B−.  Alex McLevy of The A.V. Club also gave the film a B−.  Brian Tallerico of RogerEbert.com awarded the film two stars.

References

External links
 
 

American thriller films
Films based on short fiction
2010s English-language films
2010s American films